John Edwin Worrall (2 October 1891–1980) was an English footballer who played in the Football League for Aberdare Athletic, Fulham, New Brighton, Southport, The Wednesday and Watford.

References

1891 births
1980 deaths
English footballers
Association football defenders
English Football League players
Sheffield Wednesday F.C. players
Fulham F.C. players
Aberdare Athletic F.C. players
Watford F.C. players
New Brighton A.F.C. players
Southport F.C. players
Shirebrook Miners Welfare F.C. players
Gresley F.C. players
Ripley Town F.C. players